Ahmed Ibrahim Yassin Mahmoud (born 1 January 1997) is an Egyptian professional footballer who plays as a centre-back for the Egyptian club Bank of Egypt and the Egypt national team.

Professional career
Yassin began his professional career with Misr Lel Makkasa a 1–0 Egyptian Premier League loss to El Gouna on 6 October 2019. He joined Al Ahly on loan for the 2020-21 season, and after a strong debut season joined the club permanently in the summer of 2021.

International career
Yassin debuted with the Egypt national team in a 2–1 2022 FIFA World Cup qualification win over Gabon on 16 November 2021. He was called up to represent Egypt at the 2021 FIFA Arab Cup.

References

External links
 
 

1998 births
Living people
Egyptian footballers
Egypt international footballers
Egyptian Premier League players
Association football defenders